Lemba may refer to:
 Lemba (grasshopper), a genus of insect in the subfamily Caryandinae
 Lemba people, an African ethnic group in Southern Africa

Places
 Lemba, Kinshasa, a commune in Kinshasa, Democratic Republic of the Congo
 Lembá District, a district of São Tomé Province
 Lempa, Cyprus, village in Cyprus, also known as Lemba

People
 Artur Lemba (1885–1963), Estonian composer and piano teacher
 Basaula Lemba (born 1965), Congolese football player
 Chilu Lemba (born 1975), Zambian radio and television presenter, voice over artist and musician
 Sebastián Lemba (1520-1547), Afro-Dominican slave rebel